The 1937 Home Nations Championship was the thirty-third series of the rugby union Home Nations Championship. Including the previous incarnations as the Five Nations, and prior to that, the Home Nations, this was the fiftieth series of the northern hemisphere rugby union championship. Six matches were played between 16 January and 3 April. It was contested by England, Ireland, Scotland and Wales.

Table

Results

External links

1937
Home Nations
Home Nations
Home Nations
Home Nations
Home Nations
Home Nations Championship
Home Nations Championship
Home Nations Championship
Home Nations Championship